Orleans Technical College (formerly Orleans Technical Institute) is a private technical school in Philadelphia, Pennsylvania.  It is operated by the JEVS Human Services agency and has been in operation since 1974.

References

External links
 Official website

Technical schools